Anca Tănase (born 15 March 1968) is a retired Romanian rower. She was part of the Romanian eights that won gold medals at the 1996 Olympics and 1989 and 1997 world championships, placing second in 1995 and third in 1994. She is married to the Olympic rower Iulică Ruican.

References

External links 
 
 
 
 

1968 births
Living people
Romanian female rowers
Olympic gold medalists for Romania
Rowers at the 1996 Summer Olympics
Olympic rowers of Romania
Olympic medalists in rowing
World Rowing Championships medalists for Romania
Medalists at the 1996 Summer Olympics